Ramchandrapur is a census town in Sankrail CD Block of Howrah Sadar subdivision in Howrah district in the Indian state of West Bengal. It is a part of Kolkata Urban Agglomeration.

Demographics
As per 2011 Census of India Ramchandrapur had a total population of 10,312 of which 5,284 (51%) were males and 5,028 (49%) were females. Population below 6 years was 958. The total number of literates in Ramchandrapur was 8,150 (87.13% of the population over 6 years).

Ramchandrapur was part of Kolkata Urban Agglomeration in 2011 census.

 India census, Ramchandrapur had a population of 9,014. Males constitute 52% of the population and females 48%. Ramchandrapur has an average literacy rate of 76%, higher than the national average of 59.5%: male literacy is 80% and female literacy is 71%. In Ramchandrapur, 11% of the population is under 6 years of age.

Transport
Satyen Bose Road (Sankrail Station Road) is the artery of the town.

Bus

Private Bus
 69 Sankrail railway station - Howrah Station

Mini Bus
 24 Sankrail railway station - Howrah Station

Bus Routes Without Numbers
 Sankrail railway station - New Town Shapoorji Housing Estate
 Sarenga (Kolatala More) - New Town Unitech

Train
Andul railway station and Sankrail railway station on Howrah-Kharagpur line are the nearest railway stations.

References

Cities and towns in Howrah district
Neighbourhoods in Kolkata
Kolkata Metropolitan Area